Vyazovka is a rural locality (a selo) in Kaltyayevsky Selsoviet, Tatyshlinsky District, Bashkortostan, Russia. The population was 504 as of 2010. There are 5 streets.

Geography 
Vyazovka is located 9 km southeast of Verkhniye Tatyshly (the district's administrative centre) by road. Nizhneye Kaltyayevo is the nearest rural locality.

References 

Rural localities in Tatyshlinsky District